Taylor Hill (born 2 February 1996) is a sprinter from the British Virgin Islands.

Personal bests

Competition record

References

1996 births
Living people
British Virgin Islands female sprinters